Zoë Gwen Scandalis (born 21 September 1993) is an American professional tennis player.

She won five doubles titles on the ITF Circuit in her career. On 22 August 2011, she reached her best singles ranking of world No. 711. On 29 June 2015, she peaked at No. 494 in the doubles rankings.

Scandalis made her WTA main draw debut at the 2011 Mercury Insurance Open, where she qualified for the main draw.

ITF Circuit finals

Doubles: 7 (5 titles, 2 runner-ups)

References

External links
 
 

American female tennis players
Living people
1993 births
21st-century American women